William Thomas Reddick (11 November 1935 – 17 July 2008) was an  Australian rules footballer who played with North Melbourne in the Victorian Football League (VFL).

Notes

External links 

1935 births
2008 deaths
Australian rules footballers from Victoria (Australia)
North Melbourne Football Club players